Lake Sebu, officially the Municipality of Lake Sebu (Tboli: Benwu Sbù, ; Hiligaynon: Banwa sang Sëbu ; Tagalog: Bayan ng Sëbu), is a 1st class municipality in the province of South Cotabato, Philippines. According to the 2020 census, it has a population of 81,221 people.

The bestselling Lonely Planet described Lake Sebu as a place located in a “bowl of forests and mountains.” The 42,450-hectare landscape consisting the domains of the Allah Valley is recognized by United Nations Educational, Scientific and Cultural Organization (UNESCO) as a cultural landscape in Mindanao.

Geography 

The placid lake of Lake Sebu can be found in Allah Valley near the municipality of Surallah, South Cotabato.

Barangays

Lake Sebu is politically subdivided into 19 barangays.

Climate

Demographics

The lake's shores and the surrounding rainforest are home to the indigenous T'bolis, Tirurays, Ubos and Manobos. One of the major tribes, the T'bolis are known for their weaving skills and brassware production as well as fishing skills. The rest of the population are made of Ilonggos, Bicolanos and Ilocanos.

Economy

The economy is based on aquaculture of Tilapia grown in large fish cages floating in the lake. More than one half of the land around the lake is cultivated for agriculture. The Philippine government is also trying to promote ecotourism in the area. The finishing of a concrete road cut the travel time from 4 hours to less than 30 minutes greatly improving trade and commerce.

Wildlife 
Wild boars and Philippine Deer which are considered endangered live around the lake. The lake and the surrounding rainforest are natural habitat to egrets, kingfishers, swallows, herons, Philippine cockatoos and kites.

Environmental conservation 
The Philippine government proclaimed a  area as a protected landscape. On the south-eastern watershed of the lake, a bamboo plantation was established.

References

External links

 Lake Sebu Profile at PhilAtlas.com
 Lake Sebu Profile at the DTI Cities and Municipalities Competitive Index
 [ Philippine Standard Geographic Code]
 Philippine Census Information

Municipalities of South Cotabato